Peter Dwight Donlon (December 16, 1906 – December 14, 1979) was an American rower who competed in the 1928 Summer Olympics in Amsterdam.

In 1928, he was the stroke of the American boat, which won the gold medal in the eights.

References

External links
 
 
 
 

1906 births
1979 deaths
Rowers at the 1928 Summer Olympics
Olympic gold medalists for the United States in rowing
American male rowers
Medalists at the 1928 Summer Olympics